Dimitrios Negris (born 14 March 1998) is a Greek swimmer. He competed in the men's 1500 metre freestyle event at the 2017 World Aquatics Championships. In 2019, he competed in three events at the 2019 World Aquatics Championships held in Gwangju, South Korea.

References

1998 births
Living people
Greek male swimmers
Place of birth missing (living people)
Swimmers at the 2018 Mediterranean Games
Greek male freestyle swimmers
Mediterranean Games competitors for Greece